Ernest Albert Fearman (23 March 1879 – 13 July 1949) was a British boxer. He competed in the men's lightweight event at the 1908 Summer Olympics.

References

1879 births
1949 deaths
British male boxers
Olympic boxers of Great Britain
Boxers at the 1908 Summer Olympics
Place of birth missing
Lightweight boxers